The Breadalbane Hydro-Electric Scheme is a hydroelectric scheme in the Breadalbane area of Perthshire, Scotland. It comprises seven power stations which generate 120MW of power from the dams around Loch Lyon, Loch Earn and Loch Tay.

History

Construction began in 1951. The Lawers Dam section began generating in 1956.

Further facilities were added at Killin and Stronuich. The construction was completed in 1961.

References

External links

Hydroelectric power stations in Scotland
Buildings and structures in Perth and Kinross